"Vasoline" is a song by American rock band Stone Temple Pilots from their second album, Purple. The song was the second single of the album, reaching number one on the Billboard Mainstream Rock Tracks chart for two weeks. The song's odd-sounding intro was created by Robert DeLeo, who ran his bass through a wah-wah pedal to get the said effect. The song's lyrics were written by vocalist Scott Weiland. "Vasoline" also appears on the greatest hits compilation album Thank You. A live version also appears on The Family Values 2001 Tour compilation.

Composition and meaning
During STP's performance of "Vasoline" on VH1 Storytellers, Weiland says that the song is about "feeling like an insect under a magnifying glass." During an interview with Greg Prato from SongFacts.com on October 14, 2014, Scott Weiland confirmed that the key line in this song came from a misheard lyric: His parents put on the Eagles song "Life in the Fast Lane", and Weiland thought they were singing, "Flies in the Vaseline."

In his autobiography Not Dead and Not For Sale, he adds that it "is about being stuck in the same situation over and over again. It's about me becoming a junkie. It's about lying to Jannina [Castaneda, first wife] and lying to the band about my heroin addiction."

Music videos
The music videos (directed by Kevin Kerslake) were in heavy rotation on MTV when the single was released in 1994. There are at least three different versions of the video, labeled "X Version", "Y Version", and "Z Version". All versions are similar, using parts of the same footage with some minor differences and shown in different orders. The single album art is taken directly from the music video. One portion of the "X Version" was censored when it aired on MTV. During the table scene, a man is bound to a chair while a sadistic guard prepares to puncture his eye with a drill. The uncensored version can be seen on Kerslake's YouTube channel, while the censored version is found on the band's YouTube page.

Differentiation
 X Version – begins with a shot of flypaper and then a laughing clown [Robert DeLeo]
 Y Version – begins with a butterfly-catching girl [Deanna Stevens] skipping up to the camera
 Z Version – begins with a man using a sharpening stone wheel

Track listings
UK, European, and Australian CD single
 "Vasoline" – 2:56
 "Meatplow" – 3:38
 "Andy Warhol" (David Bowie cover live) – 3:05
 "Crackerman" (live) – 4:03

German CD single
 "Vasoline" – 2:56
 "Meatplow" – 3:38

Charts

Notable appearances
"Vasoline" appeared in the video games Rock Band and SingStar Amped and is a learnable song on Rocksmith, which uses an actual guitar. The song is played at some NFL stadiums during kickoffs and in the 2012 Judd Apatow film This is 40.

References

External links
 
 
 

1994 singles
1994 songs
Music videos directed by Kevin Kerslake
Song recordings produced by Brendan O'Brien (record producer)
Songs about drugs
Songs written by Dean DeLeo
Songs written by Eric Kretz
Songs written by Robert DeLeo
Songs written by Scott Weiland
Stone Temple Pilots songs